Frederick Polydore Nodder (fl. 1770 – 1801) was an English illustrator, engraver and painter.

Nodder illustrated George Shaw's periodical The Naturalist's Miscellany. He also helped Joseph Banks prepare the Banks' Florilegium and converted most of Sydney Parkinson's Australian plant drawings from the  expedition into paintings and helped engrave them for publication. He illustrated the first published scientific description of the duck-billed platypus. There are Nodder drawings and paintings of Australian birds and butterflies in the Natural History Division of the National Museum of Ireland.

See also 
 Elizabeth Nodder

Footnotes

External links 

 National History Museum
 Zoologica Göttingen State and University Library Digitised The Naturalist's Miscellany

Botanical illustrators
British bird artists
British illustrators
British publishers (people)